Madhav Sheth (born 21 April 1980) is the chief executive officer of realme (India), the president of realme International Business Group and the vice president of realme. He is from Mumbai, Maharashtra, India.

Education 
He studied in St. Xavier’s College and received bachelor’s degree in Business, Management and Marketing from the SVKM’s Narsee Monjee Institute of Management Studies (NMIMS), Mumbai. 

He received master's degree in Business Administration and Management from Harvard Business School and is an alumnus of the same.

Career 
Sheth began his career as a sales manager for three years with the Priory Business Group in the United States. He joined Perfect Communications (India) in 2008 as a sales director and exited as its chief executive officer in 2016. The same year, he joined Oppo as its sales director where he focused primarily on online and offline sales expansion. 

On 4 May 2018, Sheth co-founded realme with Sky Li (Li Bingzhong), the former vice president of Oppo. He became the chief executive officer of realme India and Europe, followed by being the vice president of realme since 2019. He spearheads realme's strategy development, market expansion, product engineering, and brand recognition initiatives. Under Sheth's leadership, realme has become the fourth largest smartphone brand in India, according to International Data Corporation (IDC) and Counterpoint Research. Sheth is a guest columnist in various notable national and international publications such as Forbes (India), Times of India, Fortune, Economic Times, and Hindustan Times.

Leadership 
As the realme CEO, Sheth begins his day with a to-do list for an organised start to the day and connect with relevant teams for briefing through Microsoft Teams or Zoom. His leadership focuses on building agile teams that can quickly comprehend the changing market values and execute them within the product development and delivery dimension. Under Sheth's leadership, realme increased its donations to charity, especially during the Covid-19 pandemic in India.

Recognition 

 25 Most Influential Young Indians - GQ India (2021)
Emerging Global Leader of the Year - Jagran HiTech Awards (2020)
 100 Emerging Voices of 2019 - YourStory (2019)
Most Influential 40 Under 40 - Businessworld (2019)
Tech Personality of the Year - Dainik Jagran (2019)

Personal life 
He lives in Gurgaon, India with family. He prefers to play squash and read to unwind, especially books on Steve Jobs. He practices yoga and meditation for work-life balance. In the post-pandemic world, Sheth feels the lockdown was the perfect opportunity to learn a new skill and upgrade oneself.

References 

Living people
Indian chief executives
Indian business executives
1980 births
Harvard Business School alumni